Elba Otero de Jové was a Puerto Rican female politician from the New Progressive Party (PNP) who served as mayor of Arecibo, Puerto Rico and an at-large member of the House of Representatives of Puerto Rico.

Politics
She was elected as mayor of Arecibo at the 1968 general elections. in 1970 after the death of her brother Rubén Otero Bosco who was the Speaker Pro Tempore of the House of Representatives of Puerto Rico the New Progressive Party nominated her to fill the vacancy of an At-large position. She was affiliated to the Republican Party and was a member of the National Federation of Republican Women.

References 

1918 births
1995 deaths
Mayors of places in Puerto Rico
New Progressive Party members of the House of Representatives of Puerto Rico
New Progressive Party (Puerto Rico) politicians
New York University alumni
People from Arecibo, Puerto Rico
Puerto Rican politicians
Republican Party (Puerto Rico) politicians
Puerto Rican women in politics
University of Puerto Rico alumni
Women educators